Pseudomonas meliae is a fluorescent, Gram-negative, soil bacterium that causes bacterial gall of the chinaberry (Melia azedarach), from which it derives its name. Based on 16S rRNA analysis, P. meliae has been placed in the Pseudomonas syringae group. Genotypic characteristics of the causal
agent of chinaberry gall were determined by Aeini and Taghavi.

References

External links
 Type strain of Pseudomonas meliae at BacDive -  the Bacterial Diversity Metadatabase

Pseudomonadales
Bacterial tree pathogens and diseases
Bacteria described in 1981